Events from the year 1897 in China.

Incumbents
Guangxu Emperor (23rd year)

Events 

 Red Revenue incident, Chinese revenue stamps were overprinted (surcharged) and subsequently used as postage stamps in 1897

Births 

 Yang Zhongjian
 Liu Zongxiang
 He Zhuguo
 Wu Yun An
 Cheng Fangwu

Deaths 

 Li Hongzao
 Yang Changjun

References